is an autobahn located in the extreme north-west of Lower Saxony. It connects the A 31 with the Dutch border. Behind the border it continues as the Autosnelweg 7.

Exit list 

| colspan="2" style="text-align:center;" |
|Netherlands

 

|}

At this short piece of Autobahn there are no exit numbers at the exits (there is in fact just one exit).

External links 

280
A280
Rheiderland